Sebastian Elwing (born March 5, 1980) is a former German professional ice hockey goaltender. He was playing for Eisbären Berlin in the Deutsche Eishockey Liga (DEL). Elwing returned to Berlin after spending the previous four years with EHC München.

Nowadays he runs his own Hockey Goaltending School in Weisswasser named Torwartschule Elwing and is the official Goalie-Coach of the DEL Pro-Team Eisbären Berlin.

References

External links
 
 
 Goalie-School Torwartschule Elwing

1980 births
Living people
German ice hockey goaltenders
Eisbären Berlin players
EHC München players
Kassel Huskies players